This is a list of the United States Billboard Dance Club Songs number-one hits of 2016.

References

United States Dance
2016
number-one dance singles